Brampton City Council is the governing body for the City of Brampton, Ontario.

It consists of the mayor of Brampton (currently Patrick Brown), five elected regional councillors and five elected city councillors. Each councillor represents two city wards.

2022-2026 Council
Elected in the 2022 municipal election

2018-2022 Council
Elected in the 2018 municipal election

2014-2018 Council

2010-2014 Council

 Mayor Susan Fennell
 Wards 1 and 5 - Grant Gibson (city), Elaine Moore (region)
 Wards 2 and 6 - John Hutton (city), Paul Palleschi (region)
 Wards 3 and 4 - Bob Callahan (city), John Sanderson (region)
 Wards 7 and 8 - Sandra Hames (city), Gael Miles (region)
 Wards 9 and 10 - Vicky Dhillon (city), John Sprovieri (region)

Previous councils

1853
 Revee John Lynch
 John Elliot Senior
 John Holmes
 Peleg Howland

As of 1874
 Mayor John Haggert
 Reeve Kenneth Chisholm, Deputy-Reeve D. S. Leslie
 East Ward: William McCulla, John W. Cole, John Robertson
 South Ward: James Golding, John Anthony, Thomas Milner
 West Ward: William Milner, Patrick Purcell, S. Williamson
 North Ward: R. H. Lewis, J. W. Beynon, Alexander Pattullo

As of 1953
 Mayor B. Harper Bull
 Reeve C. Carman Core, Deputy-Reeve W. G. Thompson
 F. F. Beckett
 J. E. Calvert
 A. Dyball
 E. F. Furness
 Mrs. S. B. Horwood
 Cyril O'Reilly
 City executives: Clerk-Treasurer J. Galway, Assessor Norman E. Hale, Engineer George F. Kimball, Building Inspector Dennis Warren, Water Commissioners John Patterson, E. A. Ingram, Hydro Commissioners W. J. Abell, and W. P. Dale.

2003-2006
Listed as regional councillor, city councillor

 Mayor Susan Fennell
 Ward 1 and 5 - Elaine Moore, Grant Gibson
 Ward 2 and 6 - Paul Palleschi, John Hutton
 Ward 3 and 4 - Susan DiMarco, Bob Callahan
 Ward 7 and 8 - Gael Miles, Sandra Hames
 Ward 9 and 10 - John Sprovieri, Garnett Manning

2006 election
The 2006 election was held November 13, 2006; the following people were elected.

 Mayor Susan Fennell
 Ward 1 and 5 - Grant Gibson (Region), Elaine Moore (Region)
 Ward 2 and 6 - John Hutton (City), Paul Palleschi (Region)
 Ward 3 and 4 - Bob Callahan (City), John Sanderson (Region)
 Ward 7 and 8 - Sandra Hames (City), Gael Miles (Region)
 Ward 9 and 10 - Vicky Dhillon (City), John Sprovieri (Region)

Biographical information on previous councillors
 Bill Cowie Cowie unsuccessfully challenged Susan Fennell in the 2003 election. He was the Sesquicentennial co-chair, with Sandra Hames.
 Susan DiMarco Wards 3 & 4 regional, until 2006.
 Susan Fennell Before becoming Mayor, Fennell was a councillor.
 Linda Jeffrey former councillor and Ontario MPP, Mayor elect 2014
 Ed Ludlow Ward 8, 1988-1991. Unsuccessfully ran for wards 2 and 6 in the 2003 election. Age 65 as of December 2006, guilty of molesting four boys between 1971 and 1975, when he was master instructor at Tora Martial Arts. Many more victims have yet to come forward
 Garnett Manning Wards 9 and 10, 2003-2006. Lost to Vicky Dhillon. In May 2006, he won the African Canadian Achievement Award (ACAA) for Excellence in Politics.
 Peter Robertson Before becoming Mayor, Robertson was a councillor.

References

External links
 Brampton City Council

Municipal government of Brampton
Municipal councils in Ontario